The Bonneville Shoreline Trail is a mixed use (biking/hiking) recreation trail in Utah that roughly follows the shoreline of the ancient Lake Bonneville, a prehistoric pluvial lake which existed in northern Utah before naturally draining about 14,000 years ago. Some sections of the trail are complete while other parts are still being developed. The Bonneville Shoreline Trail hopes to one day stretch from the Idaho border (north of Logan, Utah) and run southward all the way to Nephi, Utah.

Passing near the large population centers of the Wasatch Front, the planned trail is located within  of 80% of the population of Utah.

Although conceptual plans for the Bonneville Shoreline Trail date from 1990 as a way to connect and preserve existing trails in the Wasatch Front, construction has been spurred on by the trail's recognition in 1999 as a Millennium Legacy Trail. As of 2016, several noncontinuous sections of the planned trail had been completed, totaling about 107 miles (172 km); however, there are plans to refurbish some completed areas as they are being connected and the length is extended. Much of the trail's construction is organized by county and city-level groups, through a combination of governmental, public, and private means. The U.S. Forest Service also provides management for construction and maintenance of the sections of the trail in the Uinta-Wasatch-Cache National Forest.

References

External links 

 

Wasatch Front
Long-distance trails in the United States
Parks in Salt Lake City
Protected areas of Salt Lake County, Utah
Protected areas of Box Elder County, Utah
Protected areas of Cache County, Utah
Protected areas of Davis County, Utah
Protected areas of Juab County, Utah
Protected areas of Utah County, Utah
Protected areas of Weber County, Utah
Wasatch Range
Hiking trails in Utah